Ramon Martí may refer to:

Raymond Martini (fl. 1250–1284), Dominican theologian
Ramon Martí Alsina (1826–1894), Catalan painter
 (1807–1857), Catalan lawyer and philosopher
 (1902–1989), Catalan journalist and socialist
 (1917–2011), Catalan art forger